"I" is a song by the American rock band Kiss from their 1981 studio album Music from “The Elder”. It was the album's second single.

Background and writing 
It is the 11th and last track on the Kiss 1981 studio album Music from “The Elder”.

The song was written by Bob Ezrin and Gene Simmons and produced by Bob Ezrin.

Personnel
Paul Stanley – lead vocals, rhythm guitar
Gene Simmons – lead vocals, bass guitar
Ace Frehley - lead guitar, backing vocals
Eric Carr – percussion, backing vocals
Bob Ezrin - percussion
Allan Schwartzberg – drums

Reception 
Brett Weiss's Encyclopedia of Kiss characterizes the song as "celebratory, fist-pumping, foot-stomping".

Commercial performance 
The song reached No. 62 in Germany and No. 48 in the Netherlands.

Kiss has a "forgotten" music video of this song on YouTube.

Charts

References

External links 
 Kiss – "I" at Discogs

1981 songs
1981 singles
Kiss (band) songs
Casablanca Records singles
Songs written by Bob Ezrin
Songs written by Gene Simmons
Song recordings produced by Bob Ezrin